Mathias Dellgoue Chago de Confiance (born 6 March 1983), commonly known simply as Chago, is a Cameroonian retired footballer who is also a Croatian citizen as of January 2006. He last played for Lokomotiva. Formerly a player of Olympic Mvolyé, Racing FC Bafoussam, NK Metalac, Dinamo Zagreb and Lokomotiva, Chago represents Cameroon at the international level, debuting in a first–team against Ivory Coast in a friendly match that was played on 13 June 2009.

Club career

Early career in Cameroon 
Chago started his football career at a youth club Olympic Mvolyé. There he played for two seasons before joining the MTN Elite one side Racing FC Bafoussam in 2000, where he until 2003.

Metalac Osijek 
At the age of 19, Chago and two other Cameroonian players ran away to Croatia, hoping to succeed in professional football there in order to feed his family of ten brothers and sisters back in Cameroon. The manager that brought them left them broke on the streets of Zagreb. Without any money to return to Cameroon, the players didn't have any choice but to stay in Croatia. Soon after the players were contacted by Croatian football icon Miroslav Blažević, who gave them his own flat to sleep at, also providing players with training sessions at the Maksimir football centre. The players had to hide from the Croatian police since they didn't have the visas which were required for their prolonged stay in Croatia.

During one of the training sessions Croatian manager Boro Ivković (to who Chago also refers as his "dad") spotted Chago's talents and immediately brought him to Osijek. His new manager linked him with a Croatian second division club NK Metalac. Chago impressed everyone in his new club and was signed on a long–term deal. Chago spent three seasons playing for Metalac, before he went on a trial to Osijek's best club, first division side NK Osijek. Chago didn't succeed at the trial but had another chance, this time with NK Dinamo Zagreb, Croatia's most successful football club.

Dinamo Zagreb
Chago was back on his way to Zagreb again, this time needing to prove his qualities in Dinamo's friendly match against Slovenian football club NK Aluminij. Having his poor family depending on him, Chago was determined to give his best in the forthcoming match and force Dinamo into signing him onto a professional contract. Before the match Chago held a speech in the dressing room for his teammates, to which he never interacted before, saying:
"Guys, I'm poor. I came all the way from Cameroon to earn money so I could feed my family. You all have contracts and earn a lot. Please, help me to play well in this match, so I can sign a contract with Dinamo."
Chago played well and amazed everyone in the club, especially the club's physios who couldn't believe that Chago endured the whole match with painful blisters all over his feet. The injury was so serious that he had to undertake surgery after the match. With his driven attitude, determination and bravery Chago immediately won over hearts both of his teammates and fans. With €30,000 per season contract on his hands, all he had to do now is to concentrate on his game.

His debut season at his new club went well. At the end of Prva HNL season 2005–06 Chago had 27 league appearances, also scoring 3 goals. Unfortunately for Chago, before the start of the next season he suffered a serious anterior abdominal wall injury. Which made things worse the injury didn't seem to be short–termed. This made Chago miss the whole 2006–07 campaign, making no appearances for Dinamo in that season. Meanwhile, Chago's manager Boro Ivković started negotiations with his club concerning Chago's annual wage. The new contract was signed by the player and manager, a 3-year €75,000 per season deal. His salary was almost matching the salaries of the club's stars at the time, The Spurs' footballers Luka Modrić and Vedran Ćorluka.

Chago was finally back for the 2007–08 season, but struggled to make any impact since he had to be careful with his abdomen which was not completely recovered. He played a total of 10 league matches, not scoring any goals.

He continued his struggle with injuries in the next season as well. He missed out on most of the matches in the summer part of Prva HNL 2008–09, but came back fully recovered and eager to play in the winter part of the campaign. Chago made a total of 16 appearances, scoring 2 goals, including the one in the last week of the season against Dinamo's fierce rivals HNK Hajduk Split. He also made 4 appearances in UEFA Champions League 2008–09 qualifying rounds and 3 appearances in Croatian Cup.

Istra 1961 (loan)
The next season his role in the side was again reduced, making just eight appearances in all competitions until January 2010 and so a loan to NK Istra 1961 followed where he found regular game time. At Istra, Chago made 12 out of 13 possible appearances, playing the full 90 minutes in the last 11 matches of the season.

Noticing his improvement at Istra, Dinamo brought him back to the first team squad and Chago made 24 appearances scoring two goals in the 10/11 season.

A slipped disc injury in the 11/12 pre-season resulted in a very long injury lay off for Chago. He missed the entire 11/12 season and four months of the 12/13 season.

Lokomotiva
Chago was loaned out to Dinamo partner club NK Lokomotiva. He made his return to action in the 12th round of the HNL, coming on as a half time substitute against NK Zagreb. He made a further 16 appearances that season, managing two goals and an assist, but struggled with form for the most part.

His loan to Lokomotiva was turned into a permanent move at the start of the 13/14 season as Chago signed a two-year contract. The 13/14 season was the best of Chago's career since his arrival in Croatia. Playing mostly as a central midfielder, he made 31 appearances in total and was appointed vice captain of the side towards the end of the season.

Foolad

On 4 July 2014, Chago agreed on a two-year contract with Iran Pro League side Foolad. He officially joined the team on 7 July 2014 after passing the club's medical tests. He signed a two-year contract with the club and was given the number 15 jersey. He made his debut for Foolad in a 2–1 loss to Tractor Sazi. Chago scored his first goal for the club on 3 April 2015 in a 2–1 victory against Esteghlal. On 29 January 2016, Chago scored the only goal of the game in a 1–0 victory over rivals Esteghlal Khuzestan.

After his contracted finished at the end of the 2015–16 season, Chago extended his contract with Foolad for one more year.

International career 
Chago was first called–up for the national squad on 30 May 2009, a week before Cameroon's World Cup qualifier against Morocco. On the next day he reported to Cameroon's training camp in Belgium where he started training with his new teammates. According to Chago, the national team staff was scouting him for a longer while with him knowing nothing about it. He did not make an appearance in the match against Morocco, but he started in the friendly match against Ivory Coast and played for 60 minutes before being subbed. For the sport section of the Croatian daily newspaper Večernji list, Chago gave an interview in which he stated that Samuel Eto'o encouraged him before the kick–off.

Personal life 
Chago was born in a poor Cameroonian family with 10 brothers and sisters. He left Cameroon in order to earn money for his family. He came to Croatia where he eventually succeeded at the top of professional football. Chago now lives with his Croatian wife Daša and their two daughters Melissa and Marceline.

Honours 
Croatian First League (5): 2005–06, 2007–08, 2008–09, 2009–10, 2010–11
Croatian Cup (4): 2006–07, 2007–08, 2008–09, 2010–11
Croatian Super Cup (2): 2006, 2010

Career statistics 

Note: the Croatian Cup appearances for Dinamo Zagreb can be viewed at the official website of the club nk-dinamo.hr under  The Match section.

1 Including the 2010 Croatian Supercup match against Hajduk Split.

References

External links 

1983 births
Living people
Cameroonian footballers
Racing Club Bafoussam players
NK Metalac Osijek players
GNK Dinamo Zagreb players
NK Istra 1961 players
NK Lokomotiva Zagreb players
Croatian Football League players
Persian Gulf Pro League players
Cameroon international footballers
Cameroonian expatriate footballers
Cameroonian expatriate sportspeople in Croatia
Expatriate footballers in Croatia
Expatriate footballers in Iran
Gostaresh Foulad F.C. players
Naturalized citizens of Croatia
Association football midfielders